Judge Knowles may refer to:

Gwynneth Knowles (born 1962), judge of the Family Division of the British High Court
Hiram Knowles (1834–1911), judge of the United States District Court for the District of Montana
John Power Knowles (1808–1887), judge of the United States District Court for the District of Rhode Island
Julian Knowles (judge) (born 1969), judge of the British High Court
Kimberley S. Knowles (born 1970), associate judge on the Superior Court of the District of Columbia
Robin Knowles (born 1960), judge of the High Court of England and Wales